The New York Giants are a professional American football team based in East Rutherford, New Jersey. They are members of the East Division of the National Football Conference (NFC) in the National Football League (NFL). They have won seven World Championship Games (Super Bowl and NFL Championship games) and one NFL Championship by virtue of having the league's best record at the end of the season in 1927.

There have been 22 head coaches for the Giants franchise. Steve Owen leads all-time in games coached and wins, and LeRoy Andrews leads all coaches in winning percentage with .828 (with at least one full season coached). Bill Arnsparger is statistically the worst coach the Giants have had in terms of winning percentage, with .200.

Of the 22 Giants coaches, three have been elected into the Pro Football Hall of Fame: Benny Friedman, Steve Owen and Bill Parcells. Several former players have been head coach for the Giants, including Doc Alexander, Earl Potteiger, Benny Friedman, Steve Owen, Jim Lee Howell, and Alex Webster. The current head coach is Brian Daboll, who was hired on January 28, 2022.

Key

Coaches
Note: Statistics are accurate through the end of the 2022 NFL season.

Notes

References

External links

 
 
 
 

 
New York Giants
Head coaches